This is a list of flags used in Mongolia. For more information about the national flag, see flag of Mongolia.

National flag

Province flags

Political party flags

Military flags

Sports flags

Historical flags

See also 

 Flag of Mongolia
 Emblem of Mongolia

References 

Flags
Lists and galleries of flags
Flags